Dibba Al-Hisn (white Dibba) is a pene-exclave of the emirate of Al-Sharjah, one of the seven United Arab Emirates. It is bordered by the Gulf of Oman from the East, Dibba Al-Baya (a province of Oman in Musandam) from the North, and Dibba Al-Fujairah from the South. It is also geographically part of the Dibba region. It is the smallest in size among the Dibbas. It is mostly known for its fish market and the ancient fortress from which it got its name. Also, it is known for its high density of population relative to the other Dibbas.

History

Pre-Islamic period 

Dibba Al-Hisn has been an important site of maritime trade and settlement since the pre-Islamic era. Although there is slight information, mainly from tombs, of settlement during the later second millennium and early first millennium BCE, contemporary with such sites as Shimal, Tell Abraq and Rumeilah, and of scattered occupation during the period of al-Dur and Mileiha, most mention of Dibba is in the period just prior to and after the coming of Islam. Under the Sasanians and their Omani clients the Al-Juland, an important market existed at Dibba. Dibba was sometimes the capital of Oman. According to Ibn Habib, "merchants from Sindh, India, China, people of the East and West came to it."

Islamic period 

 (632 - 633 CE) Soon after the death of Muhammad, a rebellion broke out at Dibba, and a faction of the Azd, led by Laqit bin Malik, nicknamed  Thu at-Taj ("The Crowned"), rejected Islam by refusing to pay the Zakat — the Islamic principle of giving a percentage of one's income to charity. Since Zakat is one of the five pillars of Islam, this faction committed an act of Ridda (apostasy), according to Islamic beliefs. Laqit was killed by an envoy of the caliph Abu Bakr, in accord with one tradition, in what may have been a relatively small struggle; however, other sources, including Al-Tabari, say that at least 10,000 rebels were killed in one of the biggest battles of the Ridda wars. The plain behind the Omani part of Dibba, Dibba Al-Baya, still contains a large cemetery, which, according to local tradition, represents the fallen apostates of Dibba ( Al-Murtaddeen).
 During the time of the Abbasid caliph Al Mu'tadid (870 - 892 CE), a great battle was fought at Dibba during the conquest of Oman by the Abbasid governor of Iraq and Bahrain, Muhammad bin Nur.

Colonial period

Portuguese occupation (1624 - 1648 CE) 

Dibba Al-Hisn is believed to be the site where the Portuguese during the Habsburg Dynasty built a fort and a wall around the city. In August 1648, the Arabs besieged Muscat, Oman, and on October 31, 1648, a treaty was signed between the two opponents. The terms required the Portuguese to build the fortress of Kuriyat, Dibba Al-Hisn and Matrah (Oman).

Modern history

List of rulers of Dibba 

 Under a Hakim
 Sheikh Ahmad ibn Sultan al-Qasimi (1871–1883).
 Sheikh Rashid ibn Ahmad al-Qasimi (1883–1937)
— with Sheikh Khalid II ibn Ahmad al-Qasimi (1903–1924)
 Sheikh Ahmad ibn Rashid al-Qasimi (1937–1951)
 reincorporated into Sharjah

Note: There have been land disputes between Dibba Al-Hisn and Dibba Al-Baya, but these were resolved in the 1990s.

 ''This timeline states events related to Dibba of UAE — Dibba Al-Fujairah and Dibba Al-Hisn.
 June 3, 1973: UAE president Sheikh Zayed began an inspection tour of the Northern Emirates, including Ras al-Khaimah, Al-Rams, Dibba Al-Hisn, Dibba Al-Fujairah, Khor Fakkan, Fujairah, and Masafi.
 September 10, 1974: Mohammad Khalifa Al Kindi signed a AED 52 million contract for the construction and surfacing of the road between Khor Fakkan and Dibba (the E99 road).
 June 9, 1975: The Ministry of Communication in a memorandum asked the Supreme Council of the Federation for the authority to supervise transportation, the control of air space in all airports and all agreements made with airline companies in all the emirates. The Council of Ministers approved the construction of the highway between Dibba Al-Fujairah and Masafi at a cost of AED 94.5 Million.
 July 23, 1976: Sheikh Zayed visited Fujairah. He also inspected the new Dibba Al-Fujairah - Khor Fakkan highway project (the E99 road) and visited Falaj Al-Mualla village.
 January 19, 1977: The Federal Council of Ministers approved a number of projects costing AED 56 million, including water distribution in Ajman and Dibba.
 January 10, 1978: Sultan bin Muhammad Al-Qasimi opened the wharf at Dibba Al-Hisn, which can accommodate 80 fishing boats. Part of the port will be used as ships' berths.
 February 7, 1978: The Ministry of Water and Electricity announced that the east coast from Dibba to Fujairah had been connected through an electrical feeder station.
 January 11, 1979: The AED 14 million electrical plant in Dibba Al-Fujairah was opened by Hamad bin Mohammed Al Sharqi.
 May 27, 1980: Sheikh Rashid bin Saeed Al Maktoum ordered the immediate commencement of the 100-bed extension to the Dibba Al-Fujairah and Khor Fakkan hospitals.
 November 19, 1980: Sheikh Hamad bin Mohammed Al Sharqi laid the foundation stone for the AED 350 million Fujairah Cement Factory in Dibba Al-Fujairah.

Sports 

 Dibba Al-Hisn Sports Club

Education

Universities 

A branch of the Community College of the University of Sharjah is available in Dibba Al-Hisn.

Public schools 

Alkhalidya Secondary School

Transportation 

 Dibba Al-Hisn can be accessed from one road through UAE and two roads from Musandam (Oman).
 No airports are available in Dibba Al-Hisn due to its small size. There is an airstrip in Dibba Al-Baya for transportation to Musandam.
 Taxi service is available. There is a provision for metered taxi service to be provided from the Emirate of Sharjah.

References 
 

Populated places in the Emirate of Sharjah
Populated coastal places in the United Arab Emirates
Former Portuguese colonies
Enclaves and exclaves
Archaeological sites in the United Arab Emirates
History of the United Arab Emirates
Cities in the United Arab Emirates